Lambton was an electoral riding in Ontario, Canada. It was created in 1867 at the time of confederation. It was located in southwestern Ontario and included the town of Sarnia. In 1875 it was split into two separate ridings,  Lambton East and Lambton West. Just before the 1967 election it was reconstituted largely as a rural constituency. Another riding, Sarnia was also created to represent the growing urban centre. In 1996, all provincial riding was reduced from 133 to 103 to be harmonized as their federal counterparts. A new riding called Sarnia—Lambton was formed and continues into the present day.

Members of Provincial Parliament

References

Former provincial electoral districts of Ontario